Squads for the 2004 AFC Asian Cup played in China from 17 July to 7 August 2004.

Group A

Bahrain
Head Coach:  Srećko Juričić

China PR 
Head Coach:  Arie Haan

Indonesia 
Head Coach:  Ivan Venkov Kolev

Qatar 
Head Coach:  Philippe Troussier

Group B

Jordan 
Head Coach:  Mahmoud El-Gohary

Kuwait 
Head Coach:  Mohammed Ibrahem

South Korea 
Head Coach:  Johannes Bonfrere

United Arab Emirates 
Head Coach:  Aad De Mos

Group C

Iraq 
Head Coach:  Adnan Hamad

Saudi Arabia 
Head Coach:  Gerard van der Lem

Turkmenistan 
Head Coach:  Rahym Gurbanmämmedow

Uzbekistan
Head Coach:  Ravshan Khaydarov

Group D

Iran
Head Coach:  Branko Ivanković

Japan 
Head Coach:  Zico

Oman
Head Coach:  Milan Máčala

Thailand
Head Coach:  Chatchai Paholpat

References
Courtney, Barrie. "Asian Nations Cup 2004 Final Tournament – Extended File". RSSSF. Retrieved 2012-04-11.

AFC Asian Cup squads